Boys Planet is an ongoing South Korean reality competition show created by Mnet. It premiered on Mnet on February 2, 2023 at 20:00 KST and airs every Thursday. From February 16, 2023, the show's airtime changed to 20:50 KST instead.

Out of thousands of applicants, 98 contestants from various backgrounds were selected for the show. They were then equally split into two groups: -Group and -Group.

The show serves as a sequel to Girls Planet 999 (2021), this time featuring all male contestants.

Concept and format
Boys Planet uses a space theme: the two groups of contestants, -Group and -Group, act as "planets" and the show's hosts are dubbed "Star Masters". Under the guidance of seven "Masters", contestants must go through several rounds of evaluation, during which they have to show off their skills in singing, dancing, and rapping. After each round, the audience, known as "Star Creators", votes for their favorite trainees, determining the final debut line-up.

While its predecessor, Girls Planet 999, limited applications to South Korea, Japan, and China, the regions were expanded this season to allow for international participation.

Trainees were cast through two rounds of applications, the first lasting from December 11, 2021, to February 11, 2022, and the second from June 27, 2022, to August 21. The final contestants were chosen regardless of nationality, affiliation with an agency, or prior experience and professional history as a singer. Ultimately, 98 contestants were selected from 84 countries and regions, including South Korea, other parts of Asia, Europe, North and South America, and the Middle East, and 229 management agencies. The aim of the competition is to debut a new 9-member k-pop boy group consisting of trainees from all around the globe, making them the first 5th-generation k-pop group.

Voting system
The Mnet Plus mobile app will be the primary platform for voting and accessing content related to the contestants. Unlike Girls Planet 999, where viewers had to separately cast votes for each group, the votes will be allocated to individual contestants and equally split between the two groups this time. The voting system is being audited by Samil PwC, an external agency, to ensure transparency and fairness in voting-related processes from aggregation to the results.

Promotion and broadcast
On December 11, 2021, during the  2021 Mnet Asian Music Awards, Mnet revealed that they would release a male version of Girls Planet 999 called Boys Planet in 2022. However, due to production issues, the air date was later pushed back to early 2023.

On November 28, Mnet announced that it would unveil the first teaser video for Boys Planet at the 2022 MAMA Awards. The show's premiere date of February 2, 2023, was confirmed through a teaser photo released on December 21, 2022.

The theme song, "Here I Am" was released on December 29, 2022, accompanied by a performance of the song on M Countdown, revealing Sung Han-bin of K-Group and Zhang Hao of G-Group as the centers of their respective groups.<ref>{{cite web|author=Jung Eun-ji|script-title=ko:'보이즈플래닛' 시그널송 엔딩요정=성한빈..."신경전 장난 아니었다"|trans-title=The ending fairy of 'Boys Planets signal song = Sung Han-bin... "The war of nerves was no joke"|url=https://entertain.naver.com/read?oid=112&aid=0003607530|date=December 30, 2022|access-date=February 27, 2023|publisher=Herald Pop|via=Naver|language=ko|archive-date=February 24, 2023|archive-url=https://web.archive.org/web/20230224121707/https://entertain.naver.com/read?oid=112&aid=0003607530|url-status=live}}</ref> The contestants' profiles were released the same day. The following day, a special preview episode titled Boys Planet: Star Is Born was broadcast, featuring dance masters Baek Koo-young and Choi Young-joon, former Wanna One members Yoon Ji-sung and Kim Jae-hwan, former Iz*One members Kwon Eun-bi and Choi Ye-na, as well as all current members of Kep1er.

The show is simultaneously broadcast through Mnet and TVING in South Korea; AbemaTV and Mnet Japan in Japan; AfreecaTV in Vietnam, Thailand, and Indonesia; tvN Asia in Southeast Asia; and available for streaming on Rakuten Viki and Viu in selected regions, and through Mnet's YouTube channel, Mnet K-POP, in the rest of the world.

Broadcast schedule

Cast
Instead of having one host present the show for its entire run, it's being presented by so-called "Star Masters", which rotate with each round. Star Masters are usually experienced celebrities, who may give advice to and guide the trainees.

The first round was presented by former NU'EST and Wanna One member Hwang Min-hyun, with Sunmi temporarily joining him in episode 2. Actor Yeo Jin-goo hosted a special episode titled 1st Survivor Announcement Ceremony on February 24, 2023, as well as episode 5. Minhyuk of BtoB joined the show as the fourth Star Master for the second mission and as the host of the 2nd Survivor Announcement Ceremony''.

The rest of the mentors, also dubbed as "masters," are:
Dance Masters:
Baek Koo-young
Choi Young-joon
Lip J
Vocal Masters:
Heo Sol-ji
Lee Seok-hoon
Lim Han-byul
Rap Masters:
pH-1
Lil Boi (Ep. 3–4)
Bobby (Ep. 6–7)

Contestants

There are a total of 98 contestants participating in the competition. 49 are Korean, while the other 49 are from Canada, China, Hong Kong, Japan, Taiwan, Thailand, the United States, and Vietnam.

The English names of contestants are presented in accordance with the official website.

Color key (In order of contestant's group rank on the show)

Ranking

Top 9
The top 9 contestants are chosen through popularity online voting through the Mnet Plus mobile app and audience live voting, as shown at the end of each episode.

Color key

First voting period

The first voting period took place from February 2 to 24, 2023.

Star Creators voted for nine boys regardless of their group. In total, 52,434,522 votes from 176 countries were recorded. Roughly 11.9 million of these votes were cast by Koreans, while 40.5 million came from global viewers.

Eliminations were based on individual total points.

Color key

Episodes

Discography

Singles

Viewership

Aftermath

 Some contestants returned to their original groups.
 Lee Hwan-hee (52nd) returned to Up10tion.
 Xuan Hao (54th) returned to DREAM4.
 Kei (87th) returned to EDAMAME BEANS.
 Feng Junlan (93rd) returned to ECAT.
 Jung Hwan-rok (left) returned to withus.
 Yeom Tae-gyun (left) returned to Ciipher.

Notes

References

External links
 
Boys Planet at Naver 

Boys Planet
Music competitions in South Korea
K-pop television series
Reality music competition television series
Mnet (TV channel) original programming
Korean-language television shows
South Korean music television shows
2023 South Korean television series debuts